Jack Pollexfen (1908–2003) was an American writer, director and producer.

He collaborated with Aubrey Wisberg on several science fiction and monster movies of the 1950s. Before entering the film industry he worked as a journalist.

Selected filmography
The Man from Planet X (1951)
Captive Women (1952)
Sword of Venus (1953)
Captain John Smith and Pocahontas (1953)
The Neanderthal Man (1953)
Captain Kidd and the Slave Girl (1954)
Return to Treasure Island
Son of Sinbad (1955)
Indestructible Man (1956)

References

External links

American film producers
1908 births
2003 deaths